This is a list of museums in the Czech Republic.

By region

Central Bohemia
 Český Šternberk Castle (castle museum)
 Italian Court (castle museum)
 Kačina (castle museum)
 Karlštejn (castle museum)
 Konopiště (castle museum)
 Křivoklát Castle (castle museum)
 Military museum Lešany (museum of military vehicles)
 Mining Museum Příbram (museum of mining)
 Music Without Musicians, Hořovice
 Retro Auto Muzeum in Strnadice (museum of former Eastern Bloc cars)
 Škoda Auto Museum (auto museum)
 Stranov (castle museum)

Hradec Králové
 East Bohemian Museum
 Hrádek u Nechanic
 Kost Castle
 Museum of Textile in Česká Skalice
 Ratibořice

Karlovy Vary
 Kynžvart Castle
 Loket Castle

Liberec
 Bezděz Castle
 Grabštejn
 Sychrov Castle
 Valdštejn Castle
 Museum of armoured vehicles Smržovka

Moravia–Silesia
 Museum of the fortifications Hlučín
 Muzeum Těšínska
 Silesian Ostrava Castle

Olomouc
 Bouzov Castle
 Convent of Dominican Sisters in Olomouc
 Jánský vrch

Pardubice
 Chrudim Regional Museum
 Esperanto Museum of Svitavy
 Kunětice Mountain Castle
 Vysoké Mýto Regional Museum

Plzeň
 Mariánská Týnice
 Nebílovy Castle

Prague

South Bohemia
 Červená Lhota Castle
 Český Krumlov Castle
 Egon Schiele Art Centrum
 Hluboká Castle
 Kratochvíle
 Orlík Castle
 Rožmberk Castle

South Moravia
 Bítov Castle
 Dolní Kounice Synagogue
 Mendel Museum of Masaryk University
 Mikulov Castle
 Moravian Gallery in Brno
 Moravské zemské muzeum
 Museum of Romani Culture
 Pernštejn Castle
 Slavkov Castle
 Špilberk Castle
 Villa Tugendhat
 Veveří Castle
 Vranov nad Dyjí Chateau
 Windmill Ruprechtov

Ústí nad Labem
 The Chateau at Klášterec nad Ohří
 Franciscan Monastery in Kadaň
 Krásný Dvůr Castle
 Krásný Dvůr Castle

Vysočina
 Chateau at Kamenice nad Lipou

Zlín
 Buchlov
 Buchlovice Castle
 Moravská gobelínová manufaktura

See also 

 List of museums
 Tourism in the Czech Republic
 Culture of the Czech Republic

Museums
 
Czech
Museums
Museums
Czech Republic